Astrothelium lucidostromum is a species of corticolous (bark-dwelling) lichen in the family Trypetheliaceae. Found in Guyana, it was formally described as a new species in 2016 by Dutch lichenologist André Aptroot. The presence of the lichen does not induce the formation of galls in the host plant. The pseudostromata contains lichexanthone, a lichen product that causes that structure to fluoresce when lit with a long-wavelength UV light. The main characteristics of the lichen distinguishing it from others in Astrothelium are the UV+ pseudostroma; the fused ascomata; and the immersed pseudostroma that have a white cover (contrasting with the thallus colour). Astrothelium eustomuralis is a smiliar species, but in that species, lichexanthone only occurs in the  ostiole, not the entire pseudostroma.

References

lucidostromum
Lichen species
Lichens described in 2016
Lichens of Guyana
Taxa named by André Aptroot